Dongbaekseom is an island of Busan, South Korea. It is located on the west end of the Haeundae Beach right where Western Chosun Beach Hotel is located. It was designated as the 46th monument of Busan on March 9, 1999.

History 
'Dongbaek' is a Korean word for camellias, and 'Seom' is a Korean word of an island. As the name suggests, it used to be an island, but now is a part of the mainland. It became a peninsula attached to the land by sedimentation. The reason the island was named as a 'Dongbaek' island is because the island has a great number of camellias habitation. It also offers a beautiful view of Busan, with Gwangang Bridge, and Haeundae Beach.

Many poets, including Choe Chi-won, visited the scenic spot where the sea and forest are harmonized, and played around to recite their emotions to posterity.

A trail is built around Dongbaek Island, and people from the past and the present are cut down in various places, including Choi Chi-won's Haeundae, statues, and disputes, as well as Princess Hwangok's legendary mermaid statue and Nurimaru APEC House.

Notable Places 
On the island, there is a walking path which will take about 45 min to go all the away around the island.  

There is a facility called, 'Nurimaru,' an APEC House which was used to hold a 2005 APEC meetings.  

There is a statue based on the legend of Princess Hwagok, which resembles a western ancient creature, a mermaid. There is also a statue of Choi Chi Won, who is known to have named the Heaundae beach.

References

External links 
 Busan city tour website

Islands of Busan
Haeundae District